The Singapore Rugby Union is the governing body for rugby union in Singapore. It was founded in 1948. The current president is Terrence Khoo, who played for the national team from 1984 to 2000 and is a former national captain.

The Singapore Rugby Union is currently located at 900 Tiong Bahru Road, Delta Swimming Complex, Singapore 158790. This office houses all the administrative staff of the union.

Presidents

Coaches 
In 2019, Simon Mannix took over as national head coach from Mark Lee on a three year contract. In 2021, Mannix left the position to return to France.

Stadium
The Queenstown Stadium is the on field home of Singapore Rugby and is where all major games are being played.

Incidents
In October 2005, it was reported that Sean Lee, a former financial executive of the Singapore Rugby Union, absconded with SGD$300,000. On the last day of his work when he resigned, the money was found missing from the Union's accounts. In April 2007, the absconded amount was revealed to be three times more than what was originally reported in November 2005. A total of SGD$1.215 million was misappropriated over an 18-month period by writing Union checks with forged signatures to companies registered under his name.

In March 2009, nearly half of the national team went on strike citing nationality bias by the management, as well as not addressing some issues and concerns with training. Ex-captain and incumbent backrower Rong Jing Xiang was also part of the players who went on strike. After the Rugby Union met with the players to resolve the issue, the Singapore Rugby Union agreed to address some their concerns and also to implement a "balance" in the ratio of local to expatriate players in the team. In final team selections, Rong was subsequently dropped from the team.

The national team is made up largely of expatriate players. The 2009 training squad consisted of 17 expatriate players, and 13 local players. The captain, Ben Wheeler, who took over captaincy from Rong Jing Xiang (Singapore's most capped player with 45 appearances), had only 2 caps prior to the Asian 5 Nations tournament. Critics are beginning to wonder if this move by CEO Ian Bremner is a right move for the development of rugby amongst the locals in Singapore, and if the Singapore National Rugby team is headed into the same direction as Hong Kong's National Rugby team, which is dominated by expatriate players.

See also
Singapore national rugby union team
Rugby union in Singapore

References

External links
 

Rugby union governing bodies in Asia
Rugby union in Singapore
Rugby union
1948 establishments in Singapore
Sports organizations established in 1948